Earl Lunsford (October 19, 1933 – September 3, 2008), known as the "Earthquake", was a fullback for the Calgary Stampeders and is a member of the Canadian Football Hall of Fame.

College football
Lunsford played during college at with Oklahoma A&M.

Calgary
Lunsford was drafted by the Philadelphia Eagles of the National Football League in 1956, but instead began his six-year career in the Canadian Football League that year with the Calgary Stampeders. His time in Calgary was interrupted for 2 seasons, 1957 to 1958, while serving in the United States military. He played 5 more seasons for the Stamps, from 1959 to 1963.

Lunsford rushed for over 1,000 yards 5 times, leading the West Division with 1,343 yards in 1960. During his best season, 1961, he led the entire CFL with a whopping 1,794 yards, which made him known as the first running back in professional sports to rush for a mile in one season. He was an All West all star in 1960 and All Canadian in 1961. That year, Calgary finished with a mediocre 7-9 record, but defeated the Edmonton Eskimos in the Western conference semi-final. However, they lost the Western conference final to the eventual Grey Cup winner, the Bud Grant-led Winnipeg Blue Bombers. His best game was on September 3, 1962, in Calgary, when he scored 5 rushing touchdowns, still a Stampeder record.

In his career, he rushed 1199 times for 6994 yards, a 5.8 yard average, and 55 touchdowns, with his longest run being 85 yards. He is the Stampeder all-time rushing leader with 55 touchdowns and 28 100-yard games and is second among Stampeders for all-time rushing yards.

Earl Lunsford had his own theme song "Earl The Pearl of Calgary".

Career regular season rushing statistics

General manager
After his playing career, Lunsford became General Manager of the Winnipeg Blue Bombers (1968–1982) and the Calgary Stampeders (1985–1987).

Post-football honors
For his outstanding years as a dominant running back, Lunsford was elected to the Canadian Football Hall of Fame in 1983.

Death
He died September 3, 2008, aged 74, of Alzheimer's disease at his Texas home.

References

External links
 Canadian Football Hall of Fame member

1933 births
2008 deaths
American players of Canadian football
Canadian football fullbacks
Canadian Football Hall of Fame inductees
Calgary Stampeders players
Neurological disease deaths in Texas
Deaths from Alzheimer's disease
Oklahoma State Cowboys football players
People from Stillwater, Oklahoma
Players of American football from Oklahoma
Winnipeg Blue Bombers general managers